Attack of the Killer Donuts is a 2016 American horror comedy film directed by Scott Wheeler and written by Nathan Dalton, Chris De Christopher and Rafael Diaz Wagner. The film is produced by Wagner with Kelly Osmun, and stars Justin Ray as Johnny, an employee in a donut shop who, with his friends, is terrorized by an army of reanimated donuts.

Plot
Johnny Wentworth wakes and prepares to go to his job at a small donut shop called Dandy Donuts, where he works with his childhood friend Michelle Kester. He first retrieves his tablet from his Uncle Luther, a mad scientist who has unwittingly created a serum to reanimate the dead. At the shop, which is normally empty, Johnny meets with his girlfriend, Victoria, and her friend Bobby at the shop, where Victoria demands money. When Luther later arrives at the shop demanding Johnny's tablet, a fight ensues between Luther and Cliff Burbank, the owner of Dandy Donuts.

During the scuffle, a vial of the serum flies out of Luther's breast pocket and lands in the fat of the donut fryer. This causes all donuts baked in the fryer to be contaminated, and, after some time, become animated as killer donuts. The pastries now contains a poisonous green liquid that quickly incapacitates consumers and eventually kills them. Regular customer Mrs. Scolari buys a dozen of these donuts.

Two police officers also buy a box of contaminated donuts; after a handcuffed criminal eats one, he becomes sick and escapes the car, knocking the officers unconscious. A rival restaurant owner, Flanagan, visits Dandy Donuts and taunts Cliff with his new, healthier pastry. Cliff then convinces Flanagan to take home a sugar donut, unaware that the donut is contaminated. Later, while Flanagan is in the shower, the donut mutates and eats him alive.

Johnny's friend Howard enters the shop and begins talking with Johnny and Michelle. Soon after, three teenagers enter the shop and begin harassing Michelle. Johnny defends her, and the incident escalates into a fight. Cliff fires Michelle for pepper spraying the teenagers; Johnny quits in protest, and Howard follows him. To mediate the situation, Cliff provides the teenagers with a complementary box of donuts. When the teenagers attempt to eat them, they are instead attacked by the killer donuts..

While driving back, the trio encounter the criminal, who dies in front of them, due to the donuts. Continuing on, Johnny finds Bobby's car; inside, they discover Victoria cheating on Johnny with Bobby. Victoria taunts Johnny, who leaves saddened. Driving to Johnny's home, the three find the bodies of the three teenagers, along with several killer donuts. They then decide to go to Mrs. Scolari's house to ensure her safety.

Upon reaching Mrs. Scolari's house, the trio find her dead, and many killer donuts. While Michelle escapes, Johnny and Howard fight the donuts off, destroying several. The two officers, who had been searching for the escaped criminal, arrive at the house and take the trio into custody. Johnny and Michelle trick the officers into entering the house, allowing the trio to escape, and allowing the killer donuts to steal the officers' car.

The trio then visit Uncle Luther, who had developed an anti-serum. Armed with weapons and the anti-serum, Johnny, Michelle, Howard and Luther all decide to travel to the point of origin of the outbreak: Dandy Donuts. There, they find an army of killer donuts, along with a dead Cliff. Howard confesses to having an affair with Johnny's mother and sacrifices himself by venturing outside the donut shop. The officers arrive to help the group, but they are slaughtered by the donuts. While Luther escapes to make more anti-serum, Michelle and Johnny shelter in the storage closet. They decide that the only way to destroy all the killer donuts is to blow up the Dandy Donuts. They do so, escaping via the sewers and successfully destroying the killer donuts. Afterwards, Johnny and Michelle end up in bed and confess their love for each other.

Cast
 Justin Ray as Johnny Wentworth
 Kassandra Voyagis as Emma Wentworth
 Michael Swan as Uncle Luther
 Kayla Compton as Michelle Kester
 Alison England as Mrs. Scolari
 Chris De Christopher as Cliff Burbank
 Fredrick Burns as Officer Hammerstein
 C. Thomas Howell as Officer Rogers
 Ben Heyman as Howard

Reception
On review aggregator website Rotten Tomatoes, Attack of the Killer Donuts has an audience approval rating of 44% based on over 50 reviews. Metacritic assigned the film a user score of 7.6 out of 10 based on 18 reviews, indicating "general favorable reviews." Jordan Mintzer of The Hollywood Reporter called the movie "[cheap] by the dozen but nonetheless enjoyable." Noel Murray of the LA Times criticized the film as "lack[ing] any real imagination", ultimately labeling it as a project "aimed at garbage connoisseurs looking for something dumb to watch with friends on a weekend night." Charles Cargile of PopHorror.com complimented the movie as a "fun and cheesy creature feature with likable characters played by a wonderful cast."

References

External links
 
 

2010s English-language films